The economy of the Netherlands is, according to Forbes, the 15th largest in the world as of 2022 in terms of Gross domestic product (GDP). Its GDP per capita was estimated at $68,572 in the fiscal year 2022, which makes it one of the highest-earning nations in the world. 

The Netherlands has had steady natural gas resources since 1959, when a wellspring was discovered. Currently the Netherlands accounts for more than 25% of all natural gas reserves in the European Union. Over the following decades, the sale of natural gas generated a significant rise in revenue for the Netherlands.  However, the unforeseen consequences of the country's energy wealth originally impacted the competitiveness of other sectors of the economy, leading to the theory of Dutch disease, after the discovery of the vast Groningen gas field.

The Netherlands has a prosperous and open economy, which depends heavily on foreign trade. The economy is noted for stable industrial relations, fairly low unemployment and inflation, a sizable current account surplus (which, compared to the size of the country, is even more than Germany) and an important role as a European transportation hub; Rotterdam is the biggest port in Europe; and Amsterdam has one of the biggest airports in the world. Industrial activity is predominantly in food processing, chemicals, petroleum refining, high-tech, financial services, the creative sector and electrical machinery. Its highly mechanised agricultural sector employs no more than 2% of the labour force, but provides large surpluses for the food-processing industry and for exports. The Netherlands, along with 11 of its EU partners, began circulating the euro currency on 1 January 2002.

The stern financial policy was abandoned in 2009, because of the then-current credit crises. The relatively large banking sector was partly nationalised and bailed out through government interventions. The unemployment rate dropped to 5.0% in the summer of 2011, but increased with a sharp rate to 7.3% in May 2013, and 6.8% in 2015. It dropped again to 3.9% in March 2018. The state budget deficit was about 2.2% in 2015, well below the norm of 3.0% in the EU. In 2016, the state budget showed a surplus of 0.4%. It was expected to grow to a surplus of over 1.0% in 2017. 
Historically, the Dutch introduced and invented the stock market, which initially focused on merchandise trading through the Dutch East India Company. The Netherlands is a founding member of the European Union, the OECD and the World Trade Organization.

History

After declaring its independence from the empire of Philip II of Spain in 1581, the Netherlands experienced almost a century of explosive economic growth. A technological revolution in shipbuilding and trade knowledge and capital, due to Protestant traders of Flanders who fled to the Netherlands, helped the young Republic become the dominant trade power by the mid-17th century. In 1670 the Dutch merchant marine totalled 568,000 tons of shipping—about half the European total. The main reasons for this were the dominance of the Amsterdam Entrepôt in European trade, and that of the Dutch East India Company (or Verenigde Oost-Indische Companie – VOC) and West India Companies in intercontinental trade. Unique was that the V.O.C. was the first multinational, while its shares were traded at the Amsterdam stock exchange, one of the first in the world. Beside trade, an early "industrial revolution" (powered by wind, water and peat), land reclamation from the sea, and agricultural revolution, helped the Dutch economy achieve the highest standard of living in Europe (and presumably the world) by the middle of the 17th century. Affluence facilitated what is known as the Dutch Golden Age. This economic boom abruptly came to an end by a combination of political-military upheavals and adverse economic developments around 1670. Still the Netherlands kept a high level of prosperity, due to trade and agriculture.

Towards the 1800s, the Netherlands did not industrialize as rapidly as some other countries in Europe. One explanation for this is that the Netherlands were struggling to come to terms with having lost their dominant economical (based mainly on trade and agriculture) and political position in the world. Griffiths argues that government policies made possible a unified Dutch national economy in the 19th century. They included the abolition of internal tariffs and guilds; a unified coinage system; modern methods of tax collection; standardized weights and measures; and the building of many roads, canals, and railroads.

The rest of Europe in the 19th century saw the gradual transformation of the Netherlands into a modern middle-class industrial society. The number of people employed in agriculture decreased while the country made a heroic effort to revive its stake in the highly competitive industrial and trade business. The Netherlands lagged behind Belgium until the late 19th century in industrialization, then caught up by about 1920. Major industries included textiles and (later) the great Philips industrial conglomerate. Rotterdam became a major shipping and manufacturing center. Poverty slowly declined and begging largely disappeared along with steadily improving working conditions for the population.

Since 1959, the Netherlands discovered large natural gas fields. The export of natural gas led to large windfall profits. However, as an unforeseen consequence, these were believed to have led to a decline in the manufacturing sector in the Netherlands.

Government
While the private sector is the cornerstone of the Dutch economy, governments at different levels have a large part to play. Public spending, excluding social security transfer payments, was at 28% of GDP in 2011. Total tax revenue was 38.7% of GDP in 2010, which was below the EU average. In addition to its own spending, the government plays a significant role through the permit requirements and regulations pertaining to almost every aspect of economic activity. The government combines a rigorous and stable microeconomic policy with wide-ranging structural and regulatory reforms. The government has gradually reduced its role in the economy since the 1980s. Privatisation and deregulation is still continuing. With regards to social and economic policy, the government cooperates with its so called social partners (trade unions and employers' organizations). The three parties come together in the Social-Economic Council (‘Sociaal Economische Raad’), the main platform for social dialogue.

Social security system 
The Dutch social security is very comprehensive, covering Dutch residents in an encompassing manner and is divided into the national security (Volksverzekeringen) and the employee insurance (Werknemersverzekeringen). Whereas the first covers all living in the Netherlands and the social benefits provided, the latter provides employment-related benefits. All living in the Netherlands are required to pay into the social security system, including residents from outside the Netherlands, with a few exceptions.

The Volksverzekeringen is compulsory for all and covers the residents under different forms of national insurance:
 Long-term care under the Long-Term Care Act (Wet Langdurige Zorg (WLZ)) (formerly known as The Exceptional Medical Expenses Act (Algemen Wet Bijzondere Ziektekosten (AWBZ)))
 Pension care under the General Old Age Pensions Act (Algemene Ouderdomswet (AOW))
 Survivor benefits under the General Surviving Relatives Act (Algemene nabestaandenwet( ANW)) (formerly known as  The General Widow's and Orphans’ Act (Algemene Weduwen-en Wezenwet (AWW)))
 Child benefits under the General Family Allowances Act (Algemene Kinderbijslagwet (AKW))
It is overseen by the Social Insurance Bank (Sociale Verzekeringsbank (SVB)) and financed through earning-related contributions of employers and employees up until a maximum income-ceiling. Whilst employed persons get their contribution deducted automatically from their wage, the unemployed pay by themselves. The AKW is financed by employers, whereas the AOW is financed by the employees. The AOW, additionally, is financed by a small government subsidy.

The Werknemersverzekeringen is compulsory for all employed people within the Netherlands. It includes the coverage of employees in the following areas:
 Unemployment benefits under the Unemployment Insurance Act (Werkloosheidswet (WW))
 Sick leave under the Sickness Benefits Act (Ziektewet (ZW))
 Disability benefits under the Disablement Insurance Act (Wet werk en inkomen naar arbeidsvermogen (WIA))
The financing for the Werknemersverkeringen is automatically deducted from the employee's income by the employer.

Unemployment benefits

Coverage 
The unemployment benefits in the Netherlands, as set out under the WW, covers almost all employees, that are employees based on a working-contract. Excluded from the WW are the following: self-employed, nationally employed, persons working less than four days a week, heads of stockholders and voluntary workers that earn up to €150 per year.

Right to benefits 
To profit from the benefit the unemployed has to submit an application to the Employee Insurance Agency (Uitvoeringsinstituut Werknemersverzekeringen (UWV)) within one week of becoming unemployed and additionally has to register as job-seeker. The WW only covers employees with a sufficient work history,  meaning that an applicant has to have been working for at least 26 weeks in the past 36 weeks before becoming unemployed. If so, the working-weeks requirement is met. Moreover, the employee is only eligible to unemployment benefits if the unemployment has not been due to his own fault (e.g. own termination of the job contract).

Benefits 
The benefits received through the WW are earnings-related and amount to a sum of 75% percent of the previous earnings per day (which is based on 5 working days per week) for the duration of two months. After those two months the benefits amount to 70%. Part-time work is taken into account with a calculation of parts of the working hours. If this benefit is less than the minimum income, the unemployed has the possibility of supplementation through the Additional Allowances Act (Toeslagenwet) to sum up the amount. All jobs in the previous twelve months are counted in to the calculation of the benefits, if a change of work has taken place. To obtain the benefits for a continued time, the unemployed needs to be actively looking for work. Moreover, one needs to participate in e-coaching three and twelve months after the start of unemployment. After one year of unemployment one must register with an employment agency.

Controversial issues

Labour market and social welfare
The Dutch labour market has relatively strict regulations for employers on firing employees, although by June 2014 the House of Representatives has agreed to loosen these regulations. Due to the costs of employees and costs of firing them, a big part of the working force (about 15% of the working force) is an independent one person company (ZZP).  They are independent and get paid by delivery without higher social costs. Another big part of the workforce is hired as temporary workforce. State unemployment benefits in the form of a 70% benefit of the employee's last-earned salary for up to three years (with a maximum of roughly 2500 euros per month) are available for fired employees, provided that they have worked for a certain minimum time period, usually 26 weeks. Moreover, the self-employed individuals (zelfstandigen zonder personeel (ZZP)) are not automatically covered under the Werknemersverzekeringen, and are not obligated to enroll into unemployment, sickness or disabilities insurance. Self-employed individuals, hence, are required to enroll themselves with private insurance companies.

Age of retirement
Every Dutch citizen gets according to the AOW act of 1956, a state pension, from the age of 65. The act was amended in 2012 that makes the age in several stages up to 67 years in 2024 . Married couples or those who live together receive 50% of minimum wage per person and a single person receives 70% of minimum wage. Most (about 70%) earn an extra pension from private pension funds. Employees are obliged to take part in the sector pension funds. In total the amount of pension funds were at the end of 2009 some 664 billion euro and at the end of 2019 1560 billion euro for something more than 17 million people. Employees receive on average about 70% of their last salary. During the economic crisis and because of low interest rates, pensions funds have had difficulty keeping up with inflation. The Dutch pension system is regarded as one of the best in the world.

Inequality and redistribution
With a Gini coefficient of 25.1 (2013) the income inequality is relatively low in the Netherlands. However, the inequality when measured in distributions of household wealth is high, where the top 1% owns 24% of all net wealth, and the top 10% own 60%. Moreover, rather large wealth disparities persist in the Netherlands in relation to age, where those under 35 years-of-age own 10% as much as older workers. This is a consequence from the low taxation of home ownership and a generous mortgage interest deductibility, which benefit the wealthier households. Due to the generous pensions the pension-related savings are the most important part of wealth in the Netherlands, yet are not subject to capital income taxation, which increases the inequality.

Home mortgage interest deduction 
The Netherlands was one of the few countries in the world where the interest paid on mortgages is almost fully deductible from income tax. Since 2013 big changes were made. The conditions allowing a borrowing of more than 116% of the value of the home were reduced to 106% and are still continuously being reduced every year. The deduction is also capped to 50.5% and reducing every year. Together with the after-effects of the financial crisis of 2007–2008 the result was a housing crisis, with a decrease of prices almost 25% percent in some areas. Recent years have shown a recovery of 10% to even 20% per year in the most popular cities.

The Service sector accounts for more than half of the national income, primarily in transportation, distribution and logistics, financial areas, software development and the creative industry. The breadth of service providers in financial services and a Protestant work ethic have contributed to the Netherlands achieving a DAW Index score of 5 in 2012. Industrial activity is dominated by the machinery, electronics/high tech industry, metalworking, oil refining, chemical, and food-processing industries. Construction amounts to about 6% of GDP. Agriculture and fishing, although visible and traditional Dutch activities, account for just 2%.

The Netherlands continues to be one of the leading European nations for attracting foreign direct investment and is one of the five largest investors in the United States. The economy experienced a slowdown in 2005, but in 2006 recovered to the fastest pace in six years on the back of increased exports and strong investment. The pace of job growth reached 10-year highs in 2007. The Netherlands is the fifth-most competitive economy in the world, according to the World Economic Forum's Global Competitiveness Report.

Primary sector

Agriculture 
The Netherlands produced, in 2018:
 14 million tons cows milk (milk, cheese, butter, milk powder, infant formula) 
 6.5 million tons of sugar beet, which is used to produce sugar and ethanol;
 6.0 million tonnes of potato (10th largest producer in the world);
 1.2 million tons of onion;
 961 thousand tons of wheat;
 910 thousand tons of tomatoes;
 538 thousand tons of carrots;
 410 thousand tons of cucumber;
 402 thousand tons of pear;
 355 thousand tons of peppers;
 300 thousand tons of mushroom and truffle;
 295 thousand tons of lettuce;
 269 thousand tons of apple;
 247 thousand tons of barley;

In addition to smaller productions of other agricultural products.

Energy sector

Natural gas 

The discovery of the large Groningen natural gas field in 1959 and the massive windfalls accrued over subsequent decades, were believed to have led to a decline in the manufacturing sector in the Netherlands, leading to the theory of Dutch disease.

While its oil reserves in the North Sea are of little importance, the Netherlands have an estimated 25% of natural gas reserves in the EU. Natural gas reserves of the Netherlands are estimated (as of 2014) to be about 600 billion cubic feet, or about 0.3% of the world total. In 2014–2015 the government decided to reduce the production of gas in the province Groningen significantly due to problems of sinking ground, differential settlement levels and tremors (small earth quakes) causing damages to properties, end 2018 the government decided to completely abandon the gas production in the province of Groningen by reducing the production slightly each year, the production is expected to disappear entirely in 2028

To reduce its greenhouse emissions, the government of the Netherlands is subsidizing a transition away from natural gas for all homes in the country by 2050.

Nuclear energy 

Researchers in the Netherlands began studying nuclear energy in the 1930s and began construction of research reactor Dodewaard in 1955. Researchers’ goal was to introduce nuclear power technology by 1962 and replace fossil fuels. In 1968, a test nuclear reactor was attached to the power grid. This unit was shut down in 1997. In the 1970s, the Dutch chose a policy that required reprocessing all spent nuclear fuel. In 1984, the government decided to create a long-term (100 years) storage facility for all intermediate and low-level radioactive waste and research strategies for ultimate disposal. In September 2003, the Central Organization for Radioactive Waste created an interim storage facility for high-level waste. The Netherlands' only commercial nuclear reactor is Borssele, which became operational in 1973 and  produces about 4% of the country's electricity. The older Dodewaard nuclear power plant was a test reactor that later got attached to the national grid but was closed in 1997. A 2MW research reactor is located in Delft, as part of the physics department of Delft University of Technology. This reactor is not meant for energy provision, but used as a neutron and positron source for research.

In 1994, the States General of the Netherlands voted to phase out nuclear power after a discussion of nuclear waste management. In 1997, the power station at Dodewaard was shut down and the government decided it was planning to end Borssele's operating license in 2003. This has since been postponed to 2034, if it complied with the highest safety standards. After the 2010 election, the new government was open to expanding nuclear power. Both of the companies that share ownership of Borssele are proposing to build new reactors. In January 2012, Delta announced it postpones any decision to start building a second nuclear power plant.

Tourism
In 2011, the Netherlands was visited by 11.3 million foreign tourists. In 2012, the Dutch tourism industry contributed 5.4% in total to the country's GDP and 9.6% in total to its employment. With its global ranking of 147th and 83rd place for total contribution to respectively GDP and employment, tourism is a relatively small sector of the Dutch economy. North Holland was by far the most popular province for foreign tourists in 2011. Out of all 11.3 million tourists, 6 million visited North Holland. South Holland took the second place with 1.4 million. Germans, Britons and Belgians made up the majority of foreign tourists, respectively 3, 1.5 and 1.4 million.  As of 2020, there are nine World Heritage Sites in the Netherlands. The Netherlands are well known for their art and rich historical heritage.

Data 
The following table shows the main economic indicators in 1980–2021 (with IMF staff estimates in 2022–2027). Inflation under 5% is in green.

Largest companies 

The Netherlands is home to several large multinationals. Well-known multinationals are Heineken, Ahold, Philips, TomTom, Randstad and ING, all of which have their headquarters in Amsterdam. Thousands of companies of non-Dutch origin have their headquarters in the Netherlands, like EADS, LyondellBasell and IKEA, because of attractive Corporate tax levels.

The Netherlands' biggest companies as of 2011 are as following:

Mergers and acquisitions 
In the Netherlands 22,484 deals were conducted between 1985 and 2018. This sums to an overall value of 2,226.6 billion USD. The year with the most deals has been 2000 with 1,169 deals. However, the most value added up in 2007 with almost 394.9 followed by a drastic slump during the world financial crisis.

Here is a list of the most important deals in, into and out of the Netherlands.

See also
 Bureau for Economic Policy Analysis
 De Nederlandsche Bank (Central Bank of The Netherlands)
 Dutch disease
 Port of Rotterdam
 List of companies of the Netherlands
 Ministry of Finance
 Polder Model (Dutch version of consensus policy in economics)
 Social-Economic Council (economic advisory council of the Dutch government)
 Taxation in the Netherlands
 VNO-NCW (Confederation of Netherlands Industry and Employers)
 BrabantStad
 Randstad

Sources
 CBS – Statistics agency of the Netherlands
 CPB – Netherlands Bureau for Economic Policy Analysis
 DNB – Dutch central bank
 Eurostat – EU statistics agency
 CIA World Factbook
 Infographic about the relationship of energy to the economy in the Netherlands. Dutch government, 2012

External links
World Bank Summary Trade Statistics Netherlands
Useful information about the financial institutions in the Netherlands
Tariffs applied by the Netherlands as provided by ITC's Market Access Map, an online database of customs tariffs and market requirements

Further reading
 van Riel, Arthur. "Review: Rethinking the Economic History of the Dutch Republic: The Rise and Decline of Economic Modernity Before the Advent of Industrialized Growth," The Journal of Economic History, Vol. 56, No. 1 (Mar. 1996), pp. 223–229 in JSTOR
 de Vries, Johan. "Benelux, 1920–1970," in C. M. Cipolla, ed. The Fontana Economic History of Europe: Contemporary Economics Part One (1976) pp 1–71
 Vlekke, Bernard H. M. Evolution of the Dutch Nation (1945) 382 pp. online edition
 Wintle, Michael P. An Economic and Social History of the Netherlands, 1800–1920: Demographic, Economic, and Social Transition (Cambridge University Press, 2000) online edition
 van Zanden, J. L. The Economic History of The Netherlands 1914–1995: A Small Open Economy in the 'Long' Twentieth Century (Routledge, 1997)  excerpt and text search

References

 
Netherlands
Netherlands
Netherlands